Sumogrip is the ninth and final album by Lucifer's Friend before their reunion in 2014. This album once again displays the wide variety of styles Lucifer's Friend is famous for throughout their previous albums, living up to the "no album is the same" mantra. The band would stay together for a few years after the album's release before breaking up.

Track listing
"Get in" (Instrumental) - 0:36
"Heartbreaker" - 5:11
"One Way Ticket to Hell" - 5:49
"Don't Look Back" - 4:46
"You Touched Me..." - 4:15
"Cadillac" - 4:08
"Step by Step" - 4:10
"Rebound" - 4:25
"Sumogrip" (Instrumental) - 1:14
"Sheree" - 4:39
"Back in the Track" - 3:57
"Banzai" (Instrumental) - 0:33
"Any Day Now" - 3:48
"Ride the Sky" - 3:43
"Free Me" (Uriah Heep cover) - 4:44
"Get Out" (Instrumental) - 0:21
"You Touched Me with Your Heart" (Bonus Track) - 5:15

Personnel
 John Lawton – lead vocals 
 Peter Hesslein – guitar, backing vocals
 Jogi Wichmann – keyboards, drum programming (tracks 5, 11, 17)
 Andreas Dicke – bass
 Curt Cress – drums (tracks 2–4, 7, 8, 10)
 Udo Dahmen – drums (tracks 6, 13–15)

External links
 Sumo Grip review & credits at AllMusic.com
 Sumo Grip at Discogs.com

1994 albums
Lucifer's Friend albums